Nina Sobell is a contemporary sculptor, videographer, and performance artist. She began creating web-based artworks in the early 1990s.

Early life and education 

Sobell was born in Patchogue, New York in 1947. In 1969, she earned a B.F.A. at Tyler School of Art, Temple University in Philadelphia, Pennsylvania, and an in 1971 she earned an M.F.A. at Cornell University in Ithaca, New York. She taught at UCLA in the Design Media in the Arts, Film, TV and Digital Media Department in 1982 and 1983, the School of Visual Arts, New York, and served as a visiting lecturer at Goldsmiths College, University of London, in 2005 and 2006. Sobell has lectured and participated on panel discussions at many academic institutions, including Ars Electronica.

Career 

As a digital artist focusing on experimental forms of interaction and performance, Sobell uses tools such as wireless EEG headbands, MIDI sound, webcasts, and closed-circuit video surveillance. She was part of the feminist video performance movement of the 1970s with works such as  Chicken on Foot (1974) and Hey! Baby, Chicky!!  (1978), but she is best known for her work with Emily Hartzell on ParkBench and ArTisTheater  (1993). Her many other collaborators have included Billy Kluver, Anne Bean, Norman White, Sonya Allin, David Bacon, Per Biorn, John Dubberstein, Karen Finley, RJ Fleck, Jesse Gilbert, Marek Kulbacki, Julie Martin, Anders Mansson, Aaron Michaelson, Stacy Pershall, Anatole Shaw, Jeremy Slater, and Yuqing Sun. Her work appears in the collections of the Blanton Museum, Austin; Banff Centre for the Arts; Cornell University, the Getty Museum, Los Angeles; Manchester Gallery of Art; the Contemporary Arts Museum, Houston; the Zentrum fur Kunst und Medien Technologie (ZKM), Karlsruhe; the Institute of Contemporary Arts, London; Dia Art Foundation, and many other institutions and private collections.

In the early 1970s, Sobell worked with closed-circuit video to explore the relationship between artist and audience. Sobell was married to performance and  sound artist Brian Routh aka "Harry Kipper of the Kipper Kids" between 1975 and 1981, and the couple collaborated on many performance video pieces, including Interactive Electroencephalographic Video Drawings. In 1973, with the series Brainwave Drawing, Sobell set up a system in which two participants could see their brainwaves changing in real time as they simultaneously watched their images on closed-circuit video, creating an improvisational feedback loop as they silently attempted to communicate with each other.

In 1993, Nina Sobell and Emily Hartzell collaborated on the ParkBench Kiosk as artists-in-residence at New York University Center for Advanced Technology. The piece was a network of kiosks that used the internet to bring different communities and neighborhoods together, through methods such as videoconferencing and a collaborative drawing space. The locations of the kiosks were in art museums, restaurants, parks, shops, bars, subway stations, and clubs. The piece won Art & Science Collaborations' Digital99 Award and was a 1999 Webby Award Nominee and Yahoo's Pick of the Week for January 1999.

With the introduction that same year of Mosaic, the first graphical browser, Sobell and Hartzell created a "ParkBench" interface for the web and named this version of the project ArTisTheater. They turned their studio into a realtime public web installation by linking it to the web with a 24-hour webcam feed. Their goal was to explore the nature of video, performance, and surveillance on the internet, and they invited artists to use their setup on a weekly basis to create live webcast performances of various kinds. Sobell and Hartzell's first performance for ArTisTheater has been called "the first live interactive performance in the history of the World Wide Web" using a telerobotic camera operated remotely by participants. Some 80 performances are now archived in the ArTisTheater Performance Archive, and the roster of those who participated includes Martha Wilson, Margot Lovejoy, Diane Ludin, Prema Murthy, and Adrianne Wortzel.

Alice Sat Here (1995) was a very early drone mobile data collection and surveillance project, which enabled Web visitors or passersby to personally view the interior of the CODE show curated by Roz Dimon at the Ricco Maresca Gallery. Its key component was a telerobotic camera mounted on a wireless rolling chair. Sobell took the camera to the streets in one of the earliest tethered drones in the interactive installation Alice Sat Here. Web participants or passersby ran the camera via touch pads that appeared in the display window of the CODE show at the Ricco Maresca Gallery (1995) and later, at the ACM CHI conference as VirtuAlice (1997). The touch pads surrounded a closed circuit monitor with a camera at the top and fed back passerby’s images, dissolving them over the interior of the gallery so they could virtually feel a part of the show. The video images captured were made available to web viewers in real time.  Web participants could also point the camera at a rear-view mirror on the handle bars, that identified the face of anyone riding the chair, to web viewers. Sobell and Hartzell described the piece as "a passage between physical and cyber space. We converge from web-side and street-side, explore parallel spaces separated by glass, and peer through the membrane at each other's representations.” 

VirtuaAlice 1997 was a sturdier redesign of the early Drone Alice Sat Here 1995 and interacted with at CHI 97, the Computer-Human Interaction Conference in Atlanta, equipped with GUI line formation software for the Web participants. 

Barterama  (1995) was an early piece exploring the internet's many-to-many connectivity for its potential to enable a barter economy. It was essentially a proof-of-concept project, with a small website listing a dozen categories in which Sobell and Hartzell were willing to make trades, with details of specific offers and a form for facilitating actual trading.

Sobell's work is widely recognized. She was honored with a Franklin Furnace Fellowship in 2007 and is an Acker Award recipient for video (2021). She has received grants from the NEA, NYFA, and NYSCA, and was nominated for a Rockefeller Foundation Fellowship in 2003.

Partial list of exhibitions and presentations  
Unseen Unheard Solo Installation at The Window Museum, Portugal - 2020
Unseen Unheard Video 6'08 at Three Colt Street Gallery, London - 2020
Nina Sobell, Hindsight is 2020, Solo Exhibition at White Page Gallery, Valencia, Spain - 2020 (currently online www.noemata.net/wpg/nina)
Interactive Brain Wave Drawings Presentation LASER Leonardo Art and Science Forum, New York - 2018
Subliminal video, Estirando El Tiempo, curator, Elizabeth Ross, Museo de la Ciudad, Querétaro, Mexico - 2018
History of Interactive Brain Wave Drawings Panel presentation for the Brain On Art Conference, Valencia, Spain - 2017
Subliminal video in collaboration with Laura Ortman - music, commissioned by Leo Kuelbs collection. - 2016
WMAT, White Mountain Apache Tribe video in collaboration with Laura Ortman - music, commissioned by Leo Kuelbs collection - 2015
A Feast for the Eyes, curated by Heike Epildauer, Bank Austria Kunstforum, Vienna - 2010
L.E.S. Scene Then and Now curated by Shalom Neuman, Fusion Art Museum, NY - 2008
Making Love With a Chair (collaborative video for Reap) Anne Bean’s Show at Matt's Gallery, London - 2008
Apocalypse Show, sculptures, curated by Johnny Velardi, Garage Gallery, Brooklyn - 2008
Waves-The Art of the Electromagnetic Society, Hartware Kunstverein, Dortmund, Germany - 2008
California Video Show, videos Hey! Baby Chicky!!! and participatory Brain Wave Drawing Installation and documentation, curated by Glenn Phillips, Getty Museum, Los Angeles part of the Paul McCarthy Film Series.
Internal Message Search  Solo Exhibition at Gallery Area 53, Vienna, Austria - 2008
Not About: Is Solo Exhibition Location One Gallery, NY - 2008
Alice Sat Here, telerobotic installation w/Hartzell in CODE, curated by Roz Dimon, Ricco/Maresca Gallery, NYC - 2005
Synaesthesia, Thinking of You, curated by Chloe Vaitsu interactive participatory installation of Brain Wave Drawings on the internet, Institute of Contemporary Arts, London UK - 2004
Brain Wave Drawings New York State Council on the Arts, Artist Fellowship - 2001
ParkBench Webby Award nominated internet interface with Emily Hartzell - 1999
Streaming: A Laboratory, with E. Hartzell/ Sonya Allin, curated by John Tucker,W. Phillips Gallery, Banff - 1999
Sunshine & Noir: Art in Los Angeles 1960-1997, curated by Paul McCarthy, at The Armand Hammer, Castello di Rivoli, Italy, Kunstmuseum Wolfsburg, and the Louisiana MOMA, Denmark - 1999
Interactive Installations, 1974 - 1998, DAAD Studios, Berlin with Emily Hartzell - 1998                                                                         
Ebb and Flow, Web performance, Morton Studio, turbulence.org (J.Gilbert/S.Allin) - 1998
Art on the Web (ParkBench), Whitney Museum of American Art - 1996
Language and Disorder: videotapes, New Langton Arts, San Francisco - 1996
LA Sampler 1970-1993, Hey, Baby Chicky!!! Paul McCarthy curator, David Zwirner Gallery, NYC

References

External links 
 Official Nina Sobell Website
"Planetary Re-Enchantment: Human-Animal Entanglements in Victoria Vesna’s Octopus Brainstorming" By Cristina Albu MA Journal 2021.   
"Intimate Connections: Alternative Communication Threads in Nina Sobell’s Video Performances and Installations (1974-1983)" By Cristina Albu Camera Obscura: Journal of Feminism, Culture and Media Studies, Duke University Press 35, no. 1 (Spring 2020): Pages 38–75.  
Brain Art: Brain-Computer Interfaces for Artistic Expression Anton Nijholt, Editor 2020.  
[https://www.narrabase.net/Nina_Sobell.html Networked Projects in the Formative Years of the Internet: Nina Sobell - Work: 1977-1997] Judy Malloy, Editor, MIT Press 2018.

1947 births
Living people
American artists
American women artists
Internet art
Cornell University alumni
Temple University Tyler School of Art alumni
21st-century American women